Jeremy Gunawardena, a mathematician and systems biologist, is Associate Professor of Systems Biology at Harvard Medical School. He specializes in cellular signalling and decision making.

Biography 
Gunawardena obtained a PhD in algebraic topology from the University of Cambridge under Frank Adams, after which he spent two years as LE Dickson Instructor at the University of Chicago before returning to Cambridge. He set up the first computer science courses at Chicago. After leading Hewlett-Packard's research team in Europe, he joined the faculty of systems biology at the Harvard Medical School.

Work 
Gunawardena focuses on mathematical techniques in systems biology, including models for post-translational modification (multisite phosphorylation, transcription factor binding )
and other modeling of systems.

One of his most cited papers, "Multisite protein phosphorylation makes a good threshold but can be a poor switch" in Proceedings of the National Academy of Sciences,   has received 280 citations according to Google Scholar.

References

External links 
 The Virtual Cell Program @ HMS
 Jeremy Gunawardena's Faculty Profile @ HMS

Harvard Medical School faculty
Living people
Alumni of the University of Cambridge
Year of birth missing (living people)